Kevin Van Hoovels (born 31 July 1985) is a Belgian cross-country mountain biker. At the 2012 Summer Olympics, he competed in the Men's cross-country at Hadleigh Farm, finishing in 19th place.

For the 2014 season, Van Hoovels is competing on the roads for Team3M, and in mountain biking for the Versluys team.

References

Belgian male cyclists
Cross-country mountain bikers
Living people
Olympic cyclists of Belgium
Cyclists at the 2012 Summer Olympics
1985 births
People from Bonheiden